Richard Holgarth is a British guitar player with Eddie and the Hot Rods and John Otway, as well as being the former co-owner of The Square; a  music venue in Harlow, Essex.

Instruments and performances
 1979 The Gangsters - "Record Company" b/w "Harlow Town" - Stortbeat SP - guitar
 1979 The Gangsters "The Gangsters" Stortbeat Beat LP - guitar
 1979 The Gangsters "Best Friend" b/w "Best Friend Dub" - Stortbeat Beat SP - guitar
 1984 Das and Chave "Personal Ads" - Davy Lamp EP - guitar
 1985 Real by Reel/Austins Shirts "Blue/Giving Up JD For JC" - Davy Lamp EP - guitar/piano
 1986 The Internationalists "Every Fifth Man" - Davy Lamp LP - guitar/keys
 1986 The Internationalists "Let The Pressure Start" - Matchless Recs LP - guitar/keys
 1986 The Pharaohs "Blue Egypt" - Nervous LP - piano
 1991 Attila the Stockbroker "Donkeys Years" - Musidisc LP/CD - guitar/bass/keys
 1991 Attila and John Otway "Cheryl - A Rock Opera" - Strike-Back Recs CD - guitar/bass/keys
 1991 Attila and Otway "Cheryl" b..w "Trainspotter Rap" - Strike-Back Recs SP - guitar/bass/keys
 1992 Attila the Stockbroker "668:The Neighbour Of The Beast" - Larrikin Recs LP/CD - guitar/bass/keys
 1992 John Otway "Two Little Boys" - Otway Recs. OTWAYS1 CDS - guitar/bass/piano
 1992 John Otway "Under The Covers And Over The Top" - Otway Recs  CD - guitar/bass/keys
 1992 Attila the Stockbroker "This Is Free Europe" - Terz Recs LP/CD - guitar/bass/keys
 1992 Attila the Stockbroker "Never Ending Story - A Tribute to The Clash" (1 Track) - Released Emotions Recs LP/CD - guitargtr/bass/key
 1993 John Otway & The Big Band "Live!" - Amazing Feet CD - guitar
 1995 John Otway "Delilah - The Otway Sings Jones EP" - Strike-Back Recs CDS - guitar/bass/keys
 1995 John Otway "Premature Adulation" - Amazing Feet CD - guitar/bass/keys
 1999 John Otway & The Aylesbury Youth Orchestra "Birthday Boy/The Highwayman/Geneve" - Otway Recs CDS - guitar
 1999 Attila the Stockbroker "The Pen And The Sword" - Roundhead Recs CD (7 tracks) - guitar/keys/prog
 2000 The Pharaohs "London 1888" - Crazy Love Recs CD - piano/keys
 2000 John Otway & The Big Band "The Set Remains The Same" - Otway Recs CD - guitar
 2002 John Otway & The Big Band "Abbey Road Sessions" - U-Vibe Recs CD - guitar
 2002 John Otway "Bunsen Burner - The Hit Mix" - U-Vibe Recs CDS - guitar
 2003 John Otway "Scraps" - Otway Recs Triple CD (10 tracks) - guitar/bass/keys
 2004 John Otway "Ot-air " - Otway Recs CD - guitar
 2005 Eddie and the Hot Rods "Better Late Than Never" (UK) MSJ /Voiceprint Recs/(France) Bad Reputation CD - guitar/keys/piano
 2006 Eddie and the Hot Rods "Been There, Done That…" - Voiceprint Recs  CD - guitar
 2006 Eddie and the Hot Rods "Right For The Night - Live" - Voiceprint Japan CD - guitar
 2007 John Otway "The Ultimate and Pen-ultimate" - Microstar  Double CD (14 tracks) - guitar/bass/keys
 2007 John Otway "Bunsen Burner - The Album" - Microstar CD - guitar
 2009 Eddie and the Hot Rods "New York:Live" - Hotrod Recs CD - guitar
 2011 Eddie and the Hot Rods "35 Years of Teenage Depression" - Hotrod Recs CD - guitar
 2014 Eddie and the Hot Rods "Two Sides"  - Wienerworld WNRCD5073 CD - guitar

Production
 1990 The Redwoods "The Redwoods" - Davy Lamp LP
 1991 Attila the Stockbroker "Donkeys Years" - Musidisc LP/CD
 1991 Attila and John Otway "Cheryl - A Rock Opera" - Strike-Back Recs CD
 1991 Attila and Otway "Cheryl" b..w "Trainspotter Rap" - Strike-Back Recs SP
 1992 Attila the Stockbroker "668:The Neighbour Of The Beast" - Larrikin Recs LP/CD
 1992 John Otway "Two Little Boys" - Otway Recs CDS
 1992 John Otway "Under The Covers And Over The Top" - Otway Recs CD
 1992 Attila the Stockbroker "This Is Free Europe" - Terz Recs LP/CD
 1992 Attila the Stockbroker "Never Ending Story - A Tribute to The Clash" (1 Track) - Released Emotions Recs LP/CD
 1992 The Indestructible Beat "Never Ending Story - A Tribute to The Clash" (1 Track) - Released Emotions Recs LP/CD
 1993 John Otway & The Big Band "Live!" - Amazing Feet CD
 1995 John Otway "Delilah - The Otway Sings Jones EP" - Strike-Back Recs CDS
 1995 John Otway "Premature Adulation" - Amazing Feet CD
 1996 The Sweeney "Pop Gun" - Rotator CD (2 tracks)
 1997 Blyth Power "A Rededication Of Pastor Skull" - Downwarde Spiral CD
 1998 Various Artists "Bootcamp Breakout" - Polymer Recs CD
 1999 John Otway & The Aylesbury Youth Orchestra "Birthday Boy/The Highwayman/Geneve" - Otway Recs CDS
 1999 Attila the Stockbroker "The Pen And The Sword" - Roundhead Recs CD (7 tracks)
 2004 Eddie and the Hot Rods "Better Late Than Never" (UK) MSJ Recs/(UK) Voiceprint Recs/(France) Bad Reputation CD
 2006 Eddie and the Hot Rods "Been There, Done That…" - Voiceprint Recs CD
 2006 Eddie and the Hot Rods "Right For The Night - Live" - Voiceprint Japan CD
 2006 Eddie and the Hot Rods "Live 2005" - Voiceprint Recs DVD
 2007 John Otway "The Ultimate and Pen-ultimate" - Microstar 2CD (14 tracks)
 2009 Eddie and the Hot Rods "New York:Live" - Hotrod Recs CD
 2011 Eddie and the Hot Rods "35 Years of Teenage Depression" - Hotrod Recs CD

Video
 1995 John Otway - "Live at the Square" VCR - guitar
 2003 John Otway - "The Really Free Show - London Astoria" - Amazing Feet DVD - guitar
 2005 The Hamsters "Burnin' Vermin"  - Rockin' Rodent Recordings VCR/DVD - sound recording
 2006 Eddie and the Hot Rods "Live 2005" - Voiceprint Recs. VPDVD21 DVD - producer/gtr
 2006 The Hamsters, Wilko Johnson, John Otway - "The Mad, The Bad & The Dangerous" DVD - guitar
 2014 John Otway - "ROCK AND ROLL'S GREATEST FAILURE" - DVD/Blu-ray - sound editor/contributor

Film
 2012 Otway the Movie (Dir. Steve Barker) - Sound Editor/Contributor

References

External links

British rock guitarists
British male guitarists
Living people
People from Harlow
Year of birth missing (living people)
Eddie and the Hot Rods members